Wang Linkai (born 20 May 1999), commonly known by his stage name Xiao Gui (Lil Ghost in English) is a Chinese rapper and singer-songwriter. In 2017, participated in the iQIYI Hip-Hop music audition show "The Rap of China", won the top 70 in the country, and officially entered the entertainment industry. He was a member of the Chinese boy group Nine Percent from the 2018 Chinese survival talent show Idol Producer. On 29 August 2018, he won the "Best New Musician" award at the 2018 Chinese Music Festival held at Beijing National Stadium and the song "Good Night" won the Golden Melody of the Year Award.  On November 20, 2018, the group's first music album "TO THE NINES" was released with NINE PERCENT  On October 6, 2019, NINE PERCENT officially graduated  Unlock the identity of the producer in 2020 and join the Mango TV Rap music variety show "Listen Up"  He creates rap as his main form of musical expression.

Personal life 
Wang Linkai was born in Haiyang City, Yantai, Shandong Province on May 20, 1999, and grew up in Xiamen City, Fujian Province  Currently studying at Beijing Contemporary Music Academy.

His father was a military officer, and his mother was a member of the art corps of the army, so Wang Linkai grew up in the army when he was young. He became interested in hip-hop at the age of 12 or 13, and later went to school in Beijing. Because of his passion for dance, Wang Linkai once went over the wall to learn dancing at 12 o'clock in the morning.

In 2017, Wang Linkai participated in iQiyi’s self-made hip-hop reality show "THE RAP OF CHINA". In the same year, signing a contract with iQiyi's brokerage company was Guoran Sky. In January 2018, he participated in the reality show "Idol Producer" on iQiyi development, and debuted as a member of NINE PERCENT in the eighth place. On August 29, 2019, he won the Newcomer of the Year Award at the Chinese Songs And Music Festival, and his original song "Good Night" won the 2018 Golden Melody Award.

Career

2016–2017: Rap of China and first single
Wang signed with Gramarie Entertainment as a trainee. He started his career by joining The Rap of China in 2016. In 2017, he starred in a music video of Will Pan, a judge on the show. Wang released his first single with Zhu Xingjie (朱星傑) titled "Bingo!Ca$h".

2018: Idol Producer and debut with Nine Percent
He rose to fame after joining the reality survival show Idol Producer, finished 8th place on the show with a total of 7,856,601 votes and debuted as a member of Chinese boy band Nine Percent.

2019: Solo Career
Xiao Gui participated as a regular cast on an iQiyi RV reality show, "青春的花路". On May 11, he attended The Music Pioneer Chart's 30th Year Three Class Grand Award Ceremony, where he won the Best Newcomer Artist of 2018 as well as the Most Popular Artist of 2018. Xiao Gui released his first personal EP "Lil Ghost 2.0" on May 20. On October 6, Nine Percent officially disbanded. Xiao Gui performed alongside Nine Percent in Guangzhou for Nine Percent's final concert on October 12. Since then, personal forms have appeared in the entertainment circle.

2020
March 2020, Zhejiang Satellite TV Music Program "Sound from Heaven". In June, she participated in the fifth season of "Rap and Listen to Me" and "The King of Cross-Boundary Songs". Aug. 13 - Novice Arrives on a reality show based on a driver's test. October 17th, participated in the Aichi Arts show "Cross-Dimensional Rising Star" as an expansionist. 
November 8 - Joins Oriental TV's Intergenerational Tidal Performance Variety Show "China Dream Voice Our Song Season 2".

Filmography

Television series

Television shows

Discography

Extended plays

Studio Albums

Singles

Collaborations

Public welfare 
On April 28, 2018, NINE PERCENT directed a donation of RMB 2 million to "BEIJING HANHONG LOVE CHARITY FOUNDATION"

On February 9, 2020, during the outbreak of the novel coronavirus, Wang Linkai directed a donation of RMB 200,000 to Xianfeng County People's Hospital and Badong County People's Hospital

Notes

References

External links

1999 births
Living people
People from Xiamen
Idol Producer contestants
Nine Percent members
21st-century Chinese male singers
Singers from Fujian
Chinese male rappers
Chinese Mandopop singers
Chinese male singer-songwriters